Didcot Girls' School (also known as DGS) is a secondary school with academy status for students in Didcot, Oxfordshire and the surrounding rural area. The school has been awarded with Language College and Enterprise College status (as of 2006). The mixed sixth form, known as Didcot Sixth Form, is shared with St Birinus School. The school is made up of seven houses which are named after famous women who are considered potential role models for the students. These are Adie House, Bussell House, Ennis House, Greenfield House, Kennedy House, MacArthur House and Wilson House. Each house group has a different colour; red for Adie, pink for Bussell, orange for Ennis, yellow for Greenfield, purple for Kennedy, navy for MacArthur and green for Wilson. There were eight houses, but Roddick House and Plazas House were removed in September 2010 to make six. In September 2012, following Jessica Ennis' success at the London 2012 Olympics, Ennis house was created, bringing the number of houses to seven.

The school has four main building blocks; St. Frideswide's (also known as Frids), Austen, Sherwood (formerly New Building) and Cockcroft. A large, modern sports hall is sited next to St. Frideswide's, and the canteen in St. Frideswide's is rated five stars.

The executive headteacher, Rachael Warwick, was previously the Deputy Head at Bartholomew School. The current headteacher is Georgina Littler, having been appointed from May 2020.

The "Friends of DGS" charitable committee was relaunched in 2015 by parent and staff member Lisa Turner to raise funds for the school. They have a monthly 'lottery' and September 26, 2015, sees the first ever "DGS Fest" which is a music, craft and beer festival within the school grounds.

History
The school was created by the merger in the early 1970s of the former St. Frideswides secondary modern school and adjacent Didcot Girls' Grammar School.

Notable former pupils

 Jasmine Lowson, TV presenter

Didcot Girls' Grammar School
 Henrietta Knight (racehorse trainer), trainer of Best Mate (1995-2005 racehorse) 
 Ann Packer MBE, middle-distance runner who, at the 1964 Summer Olympics, won gold in the 800 metres (in a world record) and silver in the 400 metres; she held the women's 800 metres world record from October 1964 to June 1967

References

External links

 School website

Girls' schools in Oxfordshire
Secondary schools in Oxfordshire
Academies in Oxfordshire
Didcot